Virtuality is a concept in philosophy elaborated by French thinker Gilles Deleuze.

Overview
Deleuze used the term virtual to refer to an aspect of reality that is ideal, but nonetheless real. An example of this is the meaning, or sense, of a proposition that is not a material aspect of that proposition (whether written or spoken) but is nonetheless an attribute of that proposition.  Both Henri Bergson, who strongly influenced Deleuze, and Deleuze himself build their conception of the virtual in reference to a quotation in which writer Marcel Proust defines a virtuality, memory as "real but not actual, ideal but not abstract".  A dictionary definition written by Charles Sanders Peirce, referencing the philosophy of Duns Scotus, supports this understanding of the virtual as something that is "as if" it were real, and the everyday use of the term to indicate what is "virtually" so, but not so in fact.

Deleuze argues that Henri Bergson developed "the notion of the virtual to its highest degree" and that he based his entire philosophy on it. In Bergsonism, Deleuze writes that "virtual" is not opposed to "real" but opposed to "actual", whereas "real" is opposed to "possible". This definition, which is almost indistinguishable from potential, originates in medieval Scholastics and the Medieval Latin word virtualis. Deleuze identifies the virtual, considered as a continuous multiplicity, with Bergson's "duration": "it is the virtual insofar as it is actualized, in the course of being actualized, it is inseparable from the movement of its actualization."

Other writers
Another core meaning has been elicited by Denis Berthier, in his 2004 book Méditations sur le réel et le virtuel ("Meditations on the real and the virtual"), based on uses in science (virtual image), technology (virtual world), and etymology (derivation from virtue—Latin virtus). At the same ontological level as "the possible" (i.e. ideally-possible) abstractions, representations, or imagined "fictions", the actually-real "material", or the actually-possible "probable", the "virtual" is "ideal-real".  It is what is not real, but displays the full qualities of the real—in a plainly actual (i.e., not potential)—way.  The prototypical case is a reflection in a mirror: it is already there, whether or not one can see it; it is not waiting for any kind of actualization. This definition allows one to understand that real effects may be issued from a virtual object, so that our perception of it and our whole relation to it, are fully real, even if it is not. This explains how virtual reality can be used to cure phobias.  Brian Massumi shows the political implications of this.

However, note that the writers above all use terms such as "possible", "potential" and "real" in different ways and relate the virtual to these other terms differently.  Deleuze regards the opposite of the virtual as the actual.  Rob Shields argues that the opposite of the virtual is the material for there are other actualities such as a probability (e.g., "risks" are actual dangers that have not yet materialized but there is a "probability" that they will).

According to Massumi in "Parables for the Virtual", the virtual is something "inaccessible to the senses" and can be felt in its effects. His definition goes on to explain virtuality through the use of a topological figure, in which stills of all of the steps in its transformation superposed would create a virtual image. Its virtuality lies in its inability to be seen or properly diagramed, yet can be figured in the imagination.

Theology
The virtual is far more than a technical or communications term. Martin Luther argued in his writing The Sacrament of the Body and Blood of Christ—Against the Fanatics with other Protestants, most notably Zwingli, over the virtualism of the Christian Eucharist, in alignment with Catholic tradition, that the Eucharist was actually and not virtually the body and blood of Christ.

Notes

References

Sources
 Deleuze, Gilles. 1966. Bergsonism. Trans. Hugh Tomlinson and Barbara Habberjam. NY: Zone, 1991. .
 ---. 2002a. Desert Islands and Other Texts 1953-1974. Trans. David Lapoujade. Ed. Michael Taormina. Semiotext(e) Foreign Agents ser. Los Angeles and New York: Semiotext(e), 2004. .
 ---. 2002b. "The Actual and the Virtual." In Dialogues II. Rev. ed. Trans. Eliot Ross Albert. New York and Chichester: Columbia UP. 148-152. .
 Christine Buci-Glucksmann, La folie du voir: Une esthétique du virtuel, Galilée, 2002
 Massumi, Brian. 2002. Parables for the Virtual: Movement, Affect, Sensation. Post-Contemporary Interventions ser. Durham and London: Duke UP. .
 "Origins of Virtualism: An Interview with Frank Popper conducted by Joseph Nechvatal", CAA Art Journal, Spring 2004, pp. 62–77
 Frank Popper, From Technological to Virtual Art, Leonardo Books, MIT Press, 2007
 Rob Shields, The Virtual Routledge 2003.
 Rob Shields "Virtualities", Theory, Culture & Society  23:2-3.  2006.  pp. 284–86.

Reality
Gilles Deleuze